Geneviève Mnich (born 19 February 1942), is a French actress. She has appeared in 80 films since 1972.

She was born in Cuffies, Aisne, France.

Selected filmography
 Joséphine, ange gardien (2006) (1 Episode : "La Couleur de l'amour")
 Le Cri (2006) (TV Mini-Series)
 Someone I Loved (2009)
 Happy Few (2010)
 Once in a Lifetime (2014)
 The law of Simon (2016) (TV Movie)
 A Good Man (2020)
 Full Time (2021)

References

External links

1942 births
Living people
French film actresses
Signatories of the 1971 Manifesto of the 343